An annular solar eclipse occurred at the Moon's descending node of the orbit on December 4, 1983. A solar eclipse occurs when the Moon passes between Earth and the Sun, thereby totally or partly obscuring the image of the Sun for a viewer on Earth. An annular solar eclipse occurs when the Moon's apparent diameter is smaller than the Sun's, blocking most of the Sun's light and causing the Sun to look like an annulus (ring). An annular eclipse appears as a partial eclipse over a region of the Earth thousands of kilometres wide. Annularity was visible in Cape Verde, Annobón Island of Equatorial Guinea, Gabon, the People's Republic of Congo (today's Republic of Congo), Zaire (today's Democratic Republic of Congo), northern Uganda, southern Sudan (today's South Sudan), northwestern Kenya, Ethiopia and Somalia. The Sun's altitude was 66°. Occurring 6.5 days before apogee (Apogee on December 11, 1983), the Moon's apparent diameter was near the average diameter.

Related eclipses

Eclipses in 1983 
 A total solar eclipse at the Moon's ascending node of the orbit on Saturday, June 11th, 1983.
 A partial lunar eclipse at the Moon's descending node of the orbit on Saturday, June 25th, 1983.
 An annular solar eclipse at the Moon's descending node of the orbit on Sunday, December 04th, 1983.
 A penumbral lunar eclipse at the Moon's ascending node of the orbit on Tuesday, December 20th, 1983.

Solar eclipses of 1982–1985

Saros 132

Inex series

Metonic series

Notes

References

1983 12 4
1983 in science
1983 12 4
December 1983 events